The Ten Shades of Blues is the fifth solo studio album by Cameroonian jazz bassist and musician Richard Bona. It was released on October 19, 2009 through Universal Music Jazz France. The album has charted in France and the Netherlands.

Album theme

Track listing

Personnel
Credits adapted from AllMusic.

 Richard Bona – vocals, backing vocals, bass, guitar, keyboards, mandolin, drums, percussion, production, engineering, sampling

Additional musicians
 Obed Calvaire – drums
 Ryan Cavanaugh – banjo
 Marshall Gilkes – trombone
 Christian Howes – fiddle
 Jojo Kuoh – drums
 Niladiri Kumar – sitar
 Sylvain Luc – guitar
 Shankar Mahadevan – vocals, backing vocals
 Grégoire Maret – harmonica
 Frank McComb – vocals, backing vocals
 Jean-Michel Pilc – piano
 Vivek Rajgopalan – ganjeera, konnakol, mridangam, vocal percussion
 Bob Reynolds – saxophone
 Nandini Srikar – vocals, backing vocals
 Satyajit Talwalkar – konnakol, tabla, vocal percussion
 Bert van den Brink – Hammond organ

Technical personnel
 Rob Eaton – mixing
 Joseph George – engineering
 Alex Lijin Jolly – engineering
 Brian Montgomery – engineering
 Greg Calbi – mastering
 Justin Gerrish – assistant engineer
 Rick Kwan – assistant engineer
 Aki Nishimura – assistant engineer
 Hyomin Kang – mixing assistant

Additional personnel
 Pascal Bod – release coordination
 Marie Carette – design
 Ingrid Hertfelder – photography

Chart performance

References

Richard Bona albums
2009 albums